The 2014 Miami Inferno season was the 1st season for the franchise as a member of the Ultimate Indoor Football League (UIFL). Despite having the second best record in the league, the Inferno did not have enough players to finish their remaining games.

Schedule
Key:

Regular season
All start times are local to home team

Standings

y - clinched conference title
x - clinched playoff spot

Roster

References

Miami Inferno
Miami Inferno